The AEG R.I or Riesenflugzeug 1 (meaning "giant aircraft") was a four-engined biplane bomber aircraft of World War I manufactured by AEG.

Design and development
The R.I was unusual for a multi-engined aircraft in that rather than connecting propellers directly to the engines and mounting the engines in nacelles, the R.I carried all its engines within the fuselage and turned its propellers via a system of drive shafts. A single prototype was completed and flew in 1916. Initial flights were quite successful, the aircraft being considered very manoeuvrable, but on 3 September 1918, a newly assembled propeller, which had not been given sufficient time for glue to cure, disintegrated. The vibrations resulting from that failure caused the complex transmissions and shafting connecting all four engines to both propellers to tear loose, which then cut a center section strut, resulting in the breakup of the aircraft, killing all seven crew on board. Of the seven further AEG R.1 aircraft planned or under production when the war ended, (R.21, R.22, R.59, R.60, R.61, R.62, R.63 and R.64), only R.21 was finished and R.22 partially complete.

Specifications

See also

References

R.I
1910s German bomber aircraft
Four-engined tractor aircraft
Biplanes
Aircraft first flown in 1916
Four-engined piston aircraft